The 2001 Tippeligaen was the 57th completed season of top division football in Norway. 

Each team played 26 games with three points given for wins and one point for a draw. Number thirteen and fourteen were relegated, number twelve has to play two qualification matches (home and away) against number three in the 1. divisjon (where number one and two are directly promoted) for the last spot.

Teams and locations

''Note: Table lists in alphabetical order.

League table

Relegation play-offs
Bryne won the play-offs against HamKam 3–0 on aggregate.

Results

Season statistics

Top scorers

Attendances

References

Eliteserien seasons
1
Norway
Norway